8th & Corinth station is a DART Light Rail station in Dallas, Texas. It is located at the corner of 8th and Corinth Streets in the Oak Cliff neighborhood.

It is the southernmost station on the DART system serving both the Red and Blue lines, from this point the lines diverge with the Blue line heading south and the Red Line heading southwest. The station provides free parking for passengers, as well as passenger shelters.

References

External links
 DART - 8th & Corinth Station

Dallas Area Rapid Transit light rail stations in Dallas
Railway stations in the United States opened in 1996
1996 establishments in Texas
Railway stations in Dallas County, Texas